On Thursday, April 3, 2008, an Antonov An-28 operated by Blue Wing Airlines (registration PZ-TSO) crashed upon landing at Lawa Antino Airport in Benzdorp, Suriname. The plane carried 17 passengers and a crew of 2, all of whom perished. The crash occurred around 11:00 am ART (14:00 UTC). Initial media reports indicated that the airplane had to abort the landing, as the runway was being used by another Bluewing AN-28 aircraft.
 The airplane attempted a go-around, but failed to gain height and crashed into a mountain.

Casualties
The pilot, Soeriani Jhauw-Verkuijl, was the wife of Blue Wing Airlines president Amichand Jhauw. Her brother and colleague was an eyewitness to the crash. Also among the casualties was co-pilot Robert Lackin, as well as a family of six from Antecume Pata, citizens of French Guiana. They were to have flown on to Anapaike.

A Dutch national police forensic team was dispatched to assist in the identification of victims. While nine of the victims were identified in Suriname, the last ten were identified, using DNA analysis, by a Dutch forensic institute.

Flight
The plane had taken off from Zorg en Hoop Airport in Paramaribo with seventeen passengers and two crew at 10:00 local time. Eleven were due to disembark at Lawa Antino airstrip, 10 km west of the southeastern gold mining town of Benzdorp, near the Lawa River bordering French Guiana. They were preparing to work for telecommunications company Telesur.

References

Accidents and incidents involving the Antonov An-28
Aviation accidents and incidents in 2008
Aviation accidents and incidents in Suriname
Plane crash
April 2008 events in South America